The Husqvarna Group is a Swedish manufacturer of outdoor power products including robotic lawn mowers, chainsaws, trimmers, brushcutters, cultivators, and garden tractors. Founded as a firearms manufacturer in 1689, it is one of the oldest continuously running companies in the world. Headquartered in Stockholm, Sweden, the group also produces consumer watering products under the brand Gardena, cutting equipment and diamond tools for the construction and stone industries.

Their motorcycle division was spun off in 1987, and is now owned by KTM.

Their sewing machine division was sold off in 1997 and is now owned by SVP Worldwide.

Husqvarna Group sponsors the Swedish ice hockey club HV71 where the arena nowadays holds the name Husqvarna Garden, referring to its industry and the famous arena in New York called Madison Square Garden.

History 

1689 – Firearms
The drilling work at the waterfalls in Husqvarna, southern Sweden, was the first large plant. The state-owned rifle factory had some 1,000 employees at the beginning of the 18th century. The company was spun off from Husqvarna Vapenfabriks Aktiebolag in 1959. Shotguns were produced for 300 years, the last in 1989.

1872 – Sewing machines
When demand declined, it turned out that the machinery for production of rifles was well-suited for producing sewing machines.

1874 – Kitchen equipment in cast iron
Husqvarna started a foundry to produce details for sewing machines, a large part being the base frames. Soon the assortment was broadened to include such products as kitchen equipment in cast iron and later on stoves and ovens.

1896 – Bicycles
Bicycle production began in the Huskvarna factory. Several patents were registered. The last bicycle was produced in 1962.

1903 – Motorcycles
The first motorcycle, which could reach the impressive speed of 4–5 km/hour, was produced in 1903. Starting in the 1930s, Husqvarna's lightweight engines helped make some successful track racing and motocross bikes. Husqvarna's first titles in Motocross World Championship came in 1959 and 1960. The operation was divested in 1987 and is since 2013 part of the KTM family.

1919 – Lawn mowers
When Husqvarna acquired Norrahammars Bruk in 1918, the product range expanded to heating boilers and lawn mowers. The first test with a lawn mower powered by an engine was done in 1947.

1959 – Chainsaws
As demand for bicycles, mopeds and motorcycles declined, forestry became increasingly important. The expertise in engines was utilized in new areas and the first chainsaw was produced in 1959.

1968 – Power cutters
A saw rebuilt to a power cutter in 1968 was the starting point of what today is the business area Husqvarna Construction.

1978 – Electrolux acquired Husqvarna.

1986 – The motorcycle division was sold to Cagiva.
 
1995 – Robotic lawn mowers
The world's first solar powered robotic lawn mower was launched. Sales of robotic mowers did not flourish until 15 years later.

1997 - divestment of sewing machines
The Husqvarna-branded sewing machines were sold to the VSM Group and later became part of SVP Worldwide.

1999 – Husqvarna acquired Yazoo/Kees
Husqvarna acquired Nebraska-based lawn mower manufacturer Yazoo/Kees.

2006 – On its own feet
The company was spun off by Electrolux.

2007 – Acquisitions of strong brands
The acquisition of Gardena in 2007 made the Husqvarna Group the European leader in consumer watering products.
Acquiring Zenoah brought a strong brand and geographical expansion in Japan.

2008 – Expanded presence in China
The acquisition of Jenn Feng and the construction of a new plant for chainsaws and other handheld products gave expanded presence in Asia.

2009 – Demolition robot
Husqvarna launched its first remote-controlled demolition robot.

2013 – Chainsaw chains
The decision was made to invest in a new production facility for chainsaw chains in Huskvarna.

Ongoing – 
Husqvarna developed and sold snowblowers, which were unable to reach "automated robot" status in comparison to the robotic lawnmower line.

2017 – Floor grinding and polishing
Acquired HTC Sweden AB, the leading manufacturer of floor grinding machines and related diamond tooling, along with its France, Germany, UK and USA subsidiaries.

2018 – E-Bikes (Licensing)
Electro-Bicycles offered by Pexco GmbH, Schweinfurt, Germany, founded by 
the Puello family (former executive of Haibike) and Stefan Pierer, CEO of KTM Industries AG (KTM motorcycles). Include motors by Shimano.

2019 – Celebrations
Husqvarna group are celebrating 330 years of innovation, as well as 60 years as a chainsaw manufacturer.

2020 – Floor grinding and polishing
Acquired Blastrac, manufacturer of floor grinding machines and related diamond tooling, along with its European subsidiaries.

Brands 

Husqvarna owns several brands:

 Husqvarna
 Gardena
 McCulloch
 PoulanPro
 Weed Eater
 Flymo
 Jonsered
Klippo
Diamant Boart
RedMax
HTC
Blastrac

Over the years, Husqvarna has manufactured products for retailers, including Sears. Most of these products have a model number that begins with "917".

See also 

 Husqvarna Vapenfabriks Aktiebolag
 Husqvarna Motorcycles

References

External links 

 
 HTC

1689 establishments in Sweden
21st century in Sweden
Agricultural machinery manufacturers of Sweden
Chainsaws
Companies established in 1689
Companies listed on Nasdaq Stockholm
Companies related to the Wallenberg family
Electrolux brands
Garden tool manufacturers
Huskvarna
Lawn and garden tractors
Lawn mower manufacturers
Logging
Manufacturing companies based in Stockholm
Multinational companies headquartered in Sweden
Power tool manufacturers
Robots of Sweden
Swedish brands
Tool manufacturing companies of Sweden